Workout is an album by jazz tenor saxophonist Hank Mobley released on the Blue Note label in 1962. It features performances by Mobley, pianist Wynton Kelly, bassist Paul Chambers, guitarist Grant Green, and drummer Philly Joe Jones. The album was identified by Scott Yanow in his Allmusic essay "Hard Bop" as one of 17 Essential Hard Bop Recordings. In October 2014, it was released in Japan on SHM-CD, featuring a previously unissued take of "Three Coins in the Fountain".

Track listing 
All compositions by Hank Mobley except as indicated

 "Workout" - 10:00
 "Uh Huh" - 10:43
 "Smokin'" - 7:30
 "The Best Things in Life Are Free" (Brown, DeSylva, Henderson) - 5:18
 "Greasin' Easy" - 6:58
 "Three Coins in the Fountain" (Cahn, Styne) - 5:31 Bonus track on CD
 "Three Coins in the Fountain" (Cahn, Styne) - 4:48 Bonus track on 2014 SHM-CD

Personnel 
 Hank Mobley — tenor saxophone
 Grant Green — guitar 
 Wynton Kelly — piano 
 Paul Chambers — bass
 Philly Joe Jones — drums

References 

1962 albums
Albums produced by Alfred Lion
Blue Note Records albums
Hank Mobley albums
Albums recorded at Van Gelder Studio